Piñon Hills (from piñón, Spanish for 'pine nut') is a census-designated place in San Bernardino County, California, near the Los Angeles County line. It is located along Pearblossom Highway, 28 miles east of Palmdale, and 15 miles west of the Cajon Pass where Pearblossom Highway meets Interstate 15. The town lies within 25 miles of Hesperia and Victorville. Piñon Hills is in a tri-community that consists of Piñon Hills, Phelan, and Wrightwood. The population was 7,272 at the 2010 census.

Corporations and buildings
Piñon Hills currently has only one elementary school, Piñon Hills Elementary, which is part of the Snowline Joint Unified School District. Middle school age students attend Piñon Mesa Middle School, and high school age students attend Serrano High School, both located in Phelan. There are alternative education options for students from kindergarten to senior year within the district: Snowline Virtual School, Heritage School, Eagle Summit Community Day School, and Chaparral Continuation High School.

Piñon Hills has one Fire Station in its community.

The ZIP Code is 92372, and the community is inside area codes 442 and 760.

Geography

According to the United States Census Bureau, the CDP covers an area of 32.1 square miles (83.2 km), 99.99% of it land, and 0.01% of it water.

Demographics
The 2010 United States Census reported that Piñon Hills had a population of 7,272. The racial makeup of Piñon Hills was 5,966 (82.0%) White (70.3% Non-Hispanic White), 58 (0.8%) African American, 65 (0.9%) Native American, 189 (2.6%) Asian, 4 (0.1%) Pacific Islander, 659 (9.1%) from other races, and 331 (4.6%) from two or more races. Hispanic or Latino of any race were 1,738 persons (23.9%).

The Census reported that 7,271 people (100% of the population) lived in households, 1 (0%) lived in non-institutionalized group quarters, and 0 (0%) were institutionalized.

There were 2,566 households, out of which 880 (34.3%) had children under the age of 18 living in them, 1,518 (59.2%) were opposite-sex married couples living together, 244 (9.5%) had a female householder with no husband present, 151 (5.9%) had a male householder with no wife present.  There were 135 (5.3%) unmarried opposite-sex partnerships, and 15 (0.6%) same-sex married couples or partnerships. 526 households (20.5%) were made up of individuals, and 189 (7.4%) had someone living alone who was 65 years of age or older. The average household size was 2.83.  There were 1,913 families (74.6% of all households); the average family size was 3.27.

The population was spread out, with 1,803 people (24.8%) under the age of 18, 596 people (8.2%) aged 18 to 24, 1,570 people (21.6%) aged 25 to 44, 2,387 people (32.8%) aged 45 to 64, and 916 people (12.6%) who were 65 years of age or older.  The median age was 41.4 years. For every 100 females there were 102.4 males.  For every 100 females age 18 and over, there were 101.4 males.

The homeowner vacancy rate was 2.8%; the rental vacancy rate was 8.9%.  5,542 people (76.2% of the population) lived in owner-occupied housing units and 1,729 people (23.8%) lived in rental housing units.

During 2009–2013, Piñon Hills had a median household income of $35,236, with 15.8% of the population living below the federal poverty line.

Notable people
Andy Engman was a Disney animator for over 30 years. He was born in Vaasa, Finland, and he died in Piñon Hills. There is a street named after him called Engman Road.

Events
One of the largest Military Simulation Airsoft events in the United States, Operation Lion Claws, is held in the mountains of Piñon Hills, on the Jubilee Boy Scout Ranch.

See also
Grey Butte Auxiliary Airfield

References

Census-designated places in San Bernardino County, California
San Gabriel Mountains
Wrightwood, California
Census-designated places in California